K P Dhanapalan (14 April 1950) is an Indian politician from North Paravur Ernakulam. He was the Member of Parliament representing the Chalakudy Lok Sabha constituency in Kerala, India. He belongs to Indian National Congress. He was the District Congress Committee President for Ernakulam.

Early life

He ventured into political Arena as the activist of Kerala's largest student organization Kerala Students Union. He was the unit president of KSU, at SN High School North Paravur and went on to become Ernakulam District secretary of the organization

Dhanapalan completed his pre University course from Sree Narayana Mangalam College, Maliankara and BSC Chemistry from Union Christian College, Aluva. He was also college union chairman of Union Christian College, Aluva

Political career

He served as Indian National Congress DCC President of Ernakulam, AICC Member, KPCC Member, Secretary and general secretary. He was the elected Member of Parliament in the 15th Lok Sabha representing Chalakudy Parliamentary Constituency.

Positions held

IYC Paravur Town Mandalam President.            
IYC Paravur Assembly President.                                
IYC Ernakulam District President.                                 
Councillor Paravur Municipality (10 years)                             
IYC State Vice President.         
DCC Vice President.        
KPCC Secretary.               
Chairman, Milk Producers Welfare Board                        
DCC President Ernakulam
KPCC General Secretary 
Senate Member, Cochin University.                             
2009-2014 Elected to 15th Loksabha from Chalakudy Parliament Constituency.
Pradesh Returning Officer for INC Election, Lakshadweep.          
KPCC Vice President.

References

External links
 Lok Sabha Member Profile: K. P. Dhanapalan

Living people
India MPs 2009–2014
Indian National Congress politicians from Kerala
Lok Sabha members from Kerala
Politicians from Thrissur
People from Chalakudy
1950 births